Smithsonia, also known as Cave Springs, is an unincorporated community in Lauderdale County, in the U.S. state of Alabama.

History
Smithsonia was originally known as Cave Springs, in reference to the numerous caves in the surrounding area. It was then named Smithsonia, in honor of Columbus Smith, a landowner and merchant following the American Civil War. Smith operated a ferry, general store, grist mill, and cotton gin in Smithsonia. A post office was in operation under the name Smithsonia from 1886 to 1927.

References

Unincorporated communities in Lauderdale County, Alabama
Unincorporated communities in Alabama
1886 establishments in Alabama